Little Red is a historic cure cottage located at Saranac Lake, Franklin County, New York.  It was built about 1885 and moved about 1890, 1920, and 1935. It is a small, rectangular, 14 feet by 18 feet, one room wood-frame building covered by a jerkin head gable roof.  Simple posts support a decorative gable roof over a small front porch.  It was the original cure cottage of the Adirondack Cottage Sanitarium founded by Dr. Edward Livingston Trudeau and the second building of the institution.

It was listed on the National Register of Historic Places in 1992.

References

Houses on the National Register of Historic Places in New York (state)
Gothic Revival architecture in New York (state)
Houses completed in 1885
Houses in Franklin County, New York
National Register of Historic Places in Franklin County, New York